The 1822 Delaware gubernatorial special election was held on October 1, 1822. A little more than a year into his three-year term, Democratic-Republican Governor John Collins died in office, elevating State Senate Speaker Caleb Rodney, a Federalist, to the governorship and triggering a special election for a three-year term in 1822. Former Governor Joseph Haslet ran as the Democratic-Republican nominee against James Booth, the Federalist nominee. Haslet won a narrow victory over Booth, receiving just 22 more votes than his opponent. However, for the third time in four years, a vacancy occurred; Haslet died on June 20, 1823, and State Senate Speaker Charles Thomas became Governor until the 1823 special election.

General election

Results

References

Bibliography
 
 
 

1822
Delaware
Gubernatorial
Delaware 1822